Çardaklı is a village in the Silopi district of Şırnak Province in Turkey. The village is populated by Kurds of the Sipêrtî tribe and had a population of 1,860 in 2021.

The hamlet of Tepelik is attached to Çardaklı.

References 

Villages in Silopi District
Kurdish settlements in Şırnak Province